The Basilica Hilariana was a sanctuary dedicated by the cult of Cybele on the Caelian Hill in Rome, Italy, in the name of a certain M. Poplicius Hilarus and identified by an inscription in . Its vestibule was discovered in 1889 during the construction of Rome's military hospital on the Caelian Hill, the Policlinico militare Celio, along with a mosaic floor and the inscription quoted above. However, its floor plan is unknown.

References

External links
 http://penelope.uchicago.edu/Thayer/E/Gazetteer/Places/Europe/Italy/Lazio/Roma/Rome/_Texts/PLATOP*/basilicae.html

Hilariana
Topography of the ancient city of Rome